The term Negros massacre may refer to:
the Escalante massacre (1985),
the Sagay massacre (2018), or
the Canlaon massacre (2019).